Forster Ice Piedmont is an ice piedmont lying landward of the Wordie Ice Shelf, along the west coast of the Antarctic Peninsula.

The feature was first surveyed from the ground by the British Graham Land Expedition in 1936–37, and again in more detail by Peter D. Forster and P. Gibbs of the Falkland Islands Dependencies Survey (FIDS) in 1958.  It was named by the UK Antarctic Place-Names Committee after Forster, a surveyor at Stonington Island in 1958 and at Horseshoe Island in 1960.

Further reading 
 C. S. M. Doake, ICE-SHELF STABILITY, British Antarctic Survey, Cambridge, UK, doi:10.1006/rwos.2001.0005

External links 

 Forster Ice Piedmont on USGS website
 Forster Ice Piedmont on SCAR website

References 

Ice piedmonts of Graham Land
Fallières Coast